Bruno Prasil (born 12 April 1950) is a Canadian volleyball player born in Czechoslovakia. He competed in the men's tournament at the 1976 Summer Olympics.

References

External links
 

1950 births
Living people
Canadian men's volleyball players
Olympic volleyball players of Canada
Volleyball players at the 1976 Summer Olympics
Place of birth missing (living people)